Independence State Airport  is a public-use airport located one mile (1.6 km) northwest of the central business district of Independence, a city in Polk County, Oregon, United States. It is owned by the Oregon Department of Aviation.

Serving as a general aviation airport, Independence also hosts a large residential airpark.  This facility is Oregon's only public-use airport hosting an airpark.

Airport information and statistics 

For the 12-month period ending October 18, 1999, the airport had 31,658 aircraft operations, an average of 86 per day: 96% general aviation and 4% air taxi. At that time there were 142 aircraft based at this airport: 94% single-engine, 2% multi-engine and 4% ultralight.

The Starduster Cafe at the airport serves breakfast and brunch.

Incidents
On September 19, 2018, a Rutan Long-EZ crashed while landing after the front landing gear collapsed, injuring the pilot.

References

External links 
Independence State Airport Support Group

Airports established in 1964
Airports in Polk County, Oregon
Residential airparks
Independence, Oregon
1964 establishments in Oregon